Events in the year 1893 in India.

Incumbents
 Empress of India – Queen Victoria
 Viceroy of India – Henry Petty-Fitzmaurice, 5th Marquess of Lansdowne
 President of Theosophical Society – Annie Besant

Events
 National income - 5,307 million
11 September – Swami Vivekananda represented Hinduism at the Parliament of the World's Religions (1893).

Law
Partition Act

Births
5 January – Paramahansa Yogananda, yogi and guru (d.1952).
26 March – Dhirendra Nath Ganguly, film entrepreneur, actor and director (d.1978).

Full date unknown
K. C. Dey, actor (d.1962).

Deaths

References

 
India
Years of the 19th century in India